Jonathan Gardner Callahan was a member of the Wisconsin State Assembly.

Biography
Callahan was born on November 2, 1823 in Andover, Massachusetts. He attended Phillips Academy. A Presbyterian, Callahan married Maria S. Jones on April 19, 1849. They had two children.

Career
Callahan was a member of the Assembly during the 1875 session. Additionally, he was President (similar to Mayor) of Eau Claire, Wisconsin. He was a Republican.

References

People from Andover, Massachusetts
Phillips Academy alumni
American Presbyterians
19th-century Presbyterians
Mayors of Eau Claire, Wisconsin
Republican Party members of the Wisconsin State Assembly
1823 births
Year of death missing